Norovo is a rural locality (a village) in Nyuksenskoye Rural Settlement, Nyuksensky District, Vologda Oblast, Russia. The population was 15 as of 2002.

Geography 
Norovo is located 20 km east of Nyuksenitsa (the district's administrative centre) by road. Berezovo is the nearest rural locality.

References 

Rural localities in Nyuksensky District